Mason Lee (born May 30, 1990) is a Taiwanese actor. He is the son of three-time Academy Award-winning director Ang Lee, and Jane Lin, a microbiology researcher. He is best known for playing the role of Teddy in The Hangover Part II.

Filmography

Film

Television series

Music video appearances

Theater

Awards and nominations

References

External links

1990 births
Living people
Taiwanese male film actors
American male film actors
New York University alumni
Male actors from New York (state)
Place of birth missing (living people)
20th-century American male actors
21st-century American male actors
20th-century Taiwanese male actors
21st-century Taiwanese male actors
American male actors of Chinese descent
American male actors of Taiwanese descent